is a Japanese professional sumo wrestler from Katsushika, Tokyo. He is a graduate of Nihon University. His highest rank has been maegashira 7. He won a Fighting Spirit Prize in his debut tournament in the top makuuchi division in September 2019. He is a member of the Oitekaze stable.

Career
He was an amateur wrestler at Nihon University, and although he did not win an individual title he was on the winning team in the Student Yokozuna 2012 championships. He entered professional sumo in January 2014. He rose up the ranks quickly, winning championships in the jonokuchi, jonidan and makushita divisions before slowing down a little and spending eight tournaments in makushita. He won promotion to the jūryō division after the November 2015 tournament, and adopted a new shikona, having previously fought under his family name of Abiko. He wanted a two-kanji name to make it easy to remember, and suggested "Ken" from his own first name, combined with the "shō" suffix common at his Oitekaze stable. However, as "kenshō" is the name used for the prize money awarded after a bout it was therefore unavailable, and he used the reading "Tsurugi" instead. 

He took some time to settle in jūryō, recording a succession of 7–8 and 8–7 scores, before suffering a setback in March 2018 with his first double-digit loss score of 4–11. However he recovered to post 11–4 in the following tournament, and in July 2019 he won the jūryō championship with a 13–2 record to earn promotion to the top makuuchi division. He was the eighth member of Oitekaze stable to win promotion to the top division since his stablemaster, ex-maegashira Daishōyama, opened the heya in 1998. He had a strong debut, scoring double-digit wins and staying in contention for the championship  with a win over Takarafuji on Day 13. Although he lost his last two matches he was awarded the Fighting Spirit Prize on Day 15. He was promoted to a new highest rank of maegashira 7 for the November 2019 tournament, but could only score 6–9 there. He suffered a left knee injury in January 2020, but competed until the end of the tournament, again scoring 6–9. He entered in March but withdrew on Day 5, with the medical certificate citing a left knee anterior cruciate ligament injury. By the time of the next tournament, held in July 2020, he was back in jūryō. In January 2021 he won his second jūryō championship with a 12–3 record. His stablemate Daieishō won the makuuchi championship in the same tournament. This was the first time that the top two divisions had been won by members of the same stable since Takasago stable's Asashōryū and Tōki in November 2005. This saw him promoted back to the top division for the March 2021 tournament. He returned to jūryō after scoring only 5–10 in September 2021.

Fighting style
Tsurugishō is a yotsu-sumo wrestler, who prefers grabbing the mawashi to pushing or thrusting at his opponents. His favoured grip is migi-yotsu, a left arm outside, right hand inside position. His most common winning kimarite or technique is yori-kiri or force out.

Career record

See also
List of sumo tournament second division champions
List of active sumo wrestlers
Active special prize winners

References

External links

1991 births
Living people
Japanese sumo wrestlers
Sumo people from Tokyo
Nihon University alumni